River Leven could refer to one of the following:

 River Leven, Cumbria (historically in Lancashire), England
 River Leven, Dunbartonshire, Scotland
 River Leven, Fife, Scotland
 River Leven, Argyll, Scotland at Kinlochleven
 River Leven, North Yorkshire, England
 River Leven (Tasmania), Australia
 Leven Canyon, on the River Leven (Tasmania)